Kiix-in, or Kiix?in , earlier romanized as Keeshan, was the principal residence of the Huu-ay-aht (Ohiaht) group of the Nuu-chah-nulth people. The name is onomatopoeic, and comes from the sound of waves crashing against the rocks below the village. It was initially romanised as "Keeshan", but was redesignated "Kiix-in (Former First Nation Village)" in line with the Maa-nulth Treaty.

Huu-ay-aht histories identify the village as being occupied "since time began", and an archaeological assessment found that the site had been in use for thousands of years. At some point the Huu-ay-aht were attacked by the Klallam, who drove them from the village; it was later reclaimed some point before 1850. An 1874 census found 246 residents. The village was abandoned in the 1880s or 1890s, with the Huu-ay-aht moving to the Deer Group Islands. The village was made a National Historic Site of Canada in 1999 or 2000, and is noted as containing "the best preserved remains of any Nuu-chah-nulth traditional village". With the permission of the Huu-ay-aht, a team of researchers conducted a pioneering dendroarchaeological survey in 2002 on one of the houses, named Quaksweaqwul. The team used core samples to identify the age of the house, estimating that it was constructed some time after 1835.

See also
Huu-ay-aht First Nation

References

Nuu-chah-nulth
Barkley Sound region
Heritage sites in British Columbia
First Nations history in British Columbia
History of Vancouver Island
National Historic Sites in British Columbia